The men's singles event at the 2010 South American Games was held over March 22–28.

Medalists

Draw

Final four

Top half

Bottom half

References
Draw

Men's Singles